The 1947 AAA Championship Car season consisted of 11 races, beginning in Speedway, Indiana on May 30 and concluding in Arlington, Texas on November 2.  The AAA National Champion was Ted Horn, and the Indianapolis 500 winner was Mauri Rose. Shorty Cantlon died at Indianapolis in the 500 miles race.

Schedule and results

  Race stopped after 77 miles due to wreck.
  Race stopped after 90 miles due to rain.
  No pole is awarded for the Pikes Peak Hill Climb, in this schedule on the pole is the driver who started first. No lap led was awarded for the Pikes Peak Hill Climb, however, a lap was awarded to the drivers that completed the climb.

Final points standings

Note: The points became the car, when not only one driver led the car, the relieved driver became small part of the points. Points for driver method: (the points for the finish place) / (number the lap when completed the car) * (number the lap when completed the driver)

References
 
 
 
 http://media.indycar.com/pdf/2011/IICS_2011_Historical_Record_Book_INT6.pdf  (p. 313-314)

See also
 1947 Indianapolis 500

AAA Championship Car season
AAA Championship Car
1947 in American motorsport